is a Japanese Olympic show jumping rider. He competed at the 2016 Summer Olympics in Rio de Janeiro, Brazil, where he finished 13th in the team and 64th in the individual competition.

Masui participated at two World Equestrian Games (in 2002 and 2010) and at the 2006 Asian Games.

References

External links

1969 births
Living people
Sportspeople from Nara Prefecture
Japanese male equestrians
Show jumping riders
Equestrians at the 2016 Summer Olympics
Olympic equestrians of Japan
Equestrians at the 1998 Asian Games
Equestrians at the 2006 Asian Games
Equestrians at the 2018 Asian Games
Asian Games gold medalists for Japan
Asian Games silver medalists for Japan
Asian Games medalists in equestrian
Medalists at the 1998 Asian Games
Medalists at the 2018 Asian Games